The San José Mine is a small copper-gold mine located near Copiapó, Atacama Region, Chile. The mine became known internationally for its collapse in 2010, which trapped 33 miners  underground. Its workings are reached by a long sloping roadway with many spiral turns (a diagram shows ten turns), not by a vertical mineshaft.

History

The San José Mine is located 45 kilometers northwest of Copiapó. The mine began operations in 1889. In 1957, Jorge Kemeny Letay, a Hungarian immigrant founded the San Esteban Mining Company.

According to Terra, the mine's annual sales surpassed 20 million dollars.

Between 2003 and 2010, several mining accidents occurred in the mine, causing at least three deaths. In 2007, a geologist was killed in the mine, and led to its closure. It was reopened in May 2008 by SERNAGEOMIN – Servicio Nacional de Geología y Minería (National Geology and Mining Service). In July 2010, miner Gino Cortés lost a leg in an accident.

2010 cave-in

Compañía Minera San Esteban advised national authorities on 5 August 2010 that a collapse had occurred at 14:00 local time, and rescue efforts began the next day. National Emergencies Office of Chile reported that day a list of 33 trapped and possibly deceased miners, that included Franklin Lobos, a retired footballer, and Carlos Mamani, a Bolivian miner. The miners were found alive 17 days later, on August 22. Nonetheless, it was not until 69 days after the collapse on October 13, 2010, that the first miner, Florencio Ávalos, was rescued.

San Esteban Mining Company is considering bankruptcy after the miners are rescued. San José is the only mine owned by San Esteban. President of Chile Sebastián Piñera said on October 12 that "the mine will remain closed until security measures that guard the life and dignity of the workers are established."

References 

2010 Copiapó mining accident
Copper mines in Chile
Gold mines in Chile
Mines in Atacama Region
Underground mines in Chile